M. V. Karuppiah is an Indian politician. He served as a member of the Tamil Nadu Legislative Assembly from the Sholavandan constituency representing the Anna Dravida Munnetra Kazhagam party.

References 

All India Anna Dravida Munnetra Kazhagam politicians
Living people
Year of birth missing (living people)
Tamil Nadu MLAs 2011–2016